= Health in Barbuda =

Health in Barbuda refers to the overall health of the population of the island of Barbuda. Barbuda has the highest rates of allergies, heart disease, and mental illness throughout the entire nation. Health in Barbuda is the responsibility of Barbuda's Public Health Department.

== Statistics (2011) ==
Chronic illnesses by type prevalence
AIDS (%)	Allergies (%)	Anemia (%)	Arthritis (%)	Asthma (%)	Cancer (%)	Diabetes (%)	Glaucoma (%)	Heart disease (%)	HIV (%)	Hypertension (%)	Kidney diseases (%)	Lupus (%)	Mental illness (%)	Sickle cell (%)	Stroke (%)	Other illnesses (%)
0.00%	10.75%	0.44%	6.26%	6.58%	0.32%	6.45%	1.58%	0.95%	0.00%	8.41%	0.19%	0.00%	0.57%	0.51%	0.25%	68.41%

56.25% of the population is covered by a health insurance scheme, the highest percent in the country.

Disability by type prevalence
Disability of any type (%)	Seeing (%)	Hearing (%)	Walking or climbing steps (%)	Remembering or concentrating (%)	Self care (%)	Upper body (%)	Communicating (%)
4.86%	1.95%	0.19%	1.89%	1.01%	0.69%	46.43%	0.57%

Unmet basic needs
UBN for water (%)	UBN for sanitation (%)	UBN for refuse collection (%)
1.07%	3.32%	0.94%
